The 84th Clifford Cup tournament was held between the 15 and 24 March 2019. The 2019 Clifford Cup took place after the conclusion of the regular season, with teams seeded based on their performance in the 2018-19 Dialog Rugby League season. The eventual winner was Havelock Sports Club, who last won the cup in 1981, thirty seven years ago.

Kandy SC, the defending cup holders, who finished in first place at the end of the domestic season two points ahead of Havelock Sports Club, dramatically withdrew from competition three days before the opening round. Kandy SC had requested the governing body, Sri Lanka Rugby to permit them to play all their matches at Nittawela Rugby Stadium. Sri Lanka Rugby however insisted that their games be held at the Pallekele International Cricket Stadium, stating that the other participating teams had all agreed that the matches be played on neutral grounds, resulting in Kandy SC resolving not to participate in the tournament.

The opening quarter-final match at the Colombo Racecourse ground pitted fourth placed Ceylonese Rugby & Football Club against the seventh placed Police SC. The two teams having beaten each other during the regular season. Police SC dominated the first half, scoring two tries and two penalties going into halftime with a 20-5 lead. In the second half CR &FC rallied scoring consecutive tries before Police SC replied with a second half try and a subsequent penalty to secure a 28 - 15 victory and a semi-final berth. The next scheduled match was declared a walkover with eighth seeded Air Force SC (who had only managed one win in the domestic season) securing a spot in the semi-finals following the withdrawal of the top seeded team in the competition, Kandy SC (the previous cup winner and the undefeated Dialog league champion). The fourth placed Colombo Hockey and Football Club then faced Army SC at the Colombo Racecourse. CH & FC scored an early try in the third minute of play and scored a second before Army SC responded with a try of their own. Both teams scored a try each before half time, with CH & FC going into the half time break with a 17 - 12 lead. After the break Army SC dominated play scoring a try to level the scores, with CH & FC responding some after with a try to regain the lead. Army SC scoring a subsequent try to level the score before breaking away for another try and a penalty to win 32-22. In the remaining quarter final match the second seed, Havelock SC, played their quarter final match against Navy SC, at Havelock Park. Havelock SC dominated the game scoring seven tries to three and advanced to the semi-finals. 

Sri Lanka Rugby appointed Remi Julien, a French rugby referee, to officiate in the semi-finals and the final.

In the first semi-final encounter played at the Colombo racecourse Havelock SC defeated Army SC 60 points to 29 points, running in eight tries to four. Havelock SC produced a dominant display in the first half, scoring 31 points to Army SC's three. After the break Havelock SC went onto to score another 29 points whilst Army picked up 26 points. The other semi-final match between Police SC and Air Force SC, at the Colombo Racecourse on the following day, was a closer affair, with Police SC leading 16 - 14 at half time (two tries apiece). In the second half Air Force SC went on to score another two tries whilst Police could only manage the one. The victory took Air Force SC through to the finals for the first time since 1986.
 
The final was held at Colombo Racecourse on Sunday 24 March. Scrum half, Mithun Hapugoda, opened the scoring for Havelock SC with a try in the fourth minute of the game, which was converted by Rizah Mubarak. Air Force were awarded a penalty try in the tenth minute, whilst Zayan Sabar and Chamara Dabare crossed the line for Havelock SC in the thirteenth and eighteen minute mark, both of which were subsequently converted by Mubarak. The score line at half time was 21 - 14. After the break Air Force SC’s Ishara Madhushan scored a try in the 39th minute, which was converted by Charitha Senevirathne. Havelock SC went onto to convert three penalties, with Lasindu Karunathilaka scoring a try in the dying minutes of the game, which was converted by Mubarak, securing the victory for Havelock SC, 40 -21. The cup win was the first for Havelock SC in 37 years, when they won the triple crown – Sevens, Clifford Cup and the President’s trophy.

Bracket

Matches

Quarter-finals

Semi-finals

Final

References

2019
2019 rugby union tournaments for clubs
2019 in Asian rugby union
2019 in Sri Lankan sport